Ch'uspiqucha (Quechua ch'uspi insect, generic name of flies or two-winged insects / fly, qucha lake, lagoon, "fly lake" or "insect lake", hispanicized spelling Chuspicocha) is a lake in Peru located in the Lima Region, Huarochirí Province, Quinti District. Ch'uspiqucha lies south of the mountain Qullqip'ukru of the Paryaqaqa mountain range and north of the lakes named P'itiqucha, Parya Chaka and Ch'uspi.

See also
 Nor Yauyos-Cochas Landscape Reserve
List of lakes in Peru

References

Lakes of Peru
Lakes of Lima Region